Gavriil Nikitich Gorelov (Pokrovskoye 16 March 1966, Moscow) was a painter.

He was born in Pokrovskoye, Moscow Oblast and studied at the Penza Art College from 1898 to 1903 under the well known Peredvizhniki member Konstantin Savitsky.  
He subsequently studied at the Imperial Academy of Arts from 1903 to 1911 under the battle-painter Franz Alekseevitch Rubo and the most famous of Russian realists, Ilya Repin.  For his diploma work he received the academy's highest honor, the Gold Medal.  The academy also gave him a scholarship which enabled him to study in Germany, Italy, and France from 1911 to 1912.  He would later join the AKhRR, which is unsurprising given his contact with the leaders of the Peredvizhniki movement.

See also
 List of Russian artists
 List of 20th-century Russian painters

References

External links

Online gallery 
Горелов Гавриил Никитич. maslovka.info

1880 births
1966 deaths
Burials at Novodevichy Cemetery
People from Volokolamsky District
Painters from the Russian Empire
Socialist realist artists
Soviet realist painters

{